Mikhled Al-Azmi was a member of the Kuwaiti National Assembly, representing the first district.  While political parties are technically illegal in Kuwait, Al-Azmi affiliates with Islamist deputies.

Supports Sharia draft bill
On July 10, 2001, Al-Azmi and Waleed Al-Tabtabaie presented a draft bill to amend Kuwait's penal code to meet Islamic sharia law.

Protested Against Israeli Attacks
On December 28, 2008, Kuwaiti lawmakers Mikhled Al-Azmi, Musallam Al-Barrak, Marzouq Al-Ghanim, Jaaman Al-Harbash, Ahmad Al-Mulaifi, Mohammad Hayef Al-Mutairi, Ahmad Al-Saadoun, Nasser Al-Sane, and Waleed Al-Tabtabaie protested in front of the National Assembly building against the attacks by Israel on Gaza.  Protesters burned Israeli flags, waved banners reading, "No to hunger, no to submission" and chanted "Allahu Akbar". Israel launched air strikes against Hamas in the Gaza Strip on December 26 after a six-month ceasefire ended on December 18.

References

Kuwaiti people of Arab descent
Members of the National Assembly (Kuwait)
Living people
1961 births